JV Lideral Futebol Clube, also known as JV Lideral, are a Brazilian football team from Imperatriz, Maranhão, Brazil. They competed in the Copa do Brasil once, and won the Campeonato Maranhense once.

History 
JV Lideral Futebol Clube were founded on May 12, 2005. They won the 2009 Campeonato Maranhense, after beating Sampaio Corrêa in the final. JV Liveral's Romarinho, with 14 goals, was the league's top goalscorer. JV Lideral competed in the 2010 Copa do Brasil, and were eliminated in the first stage by Ponte Preta.

Stadium 
JV Lideral play their home games at Estádio Walter Lira. The stadium has a maximum capacity of 1,200 people.

Current squad (selected)

Achievements 
Campeonato Maranhense: 1
2009

References

External links 
  Official website

Association football clubs established in 2005
Football clubs in Maranhão
2005 establishments in Brazil